Tejaswini Kolhapure (born 1 January 1980)is an Indian super model and actress.

Personal life
Kolhapure was born in Mumbai in a Maharashtrian family. Her father, Pandharinath Kolhapure, is a classical singer whose family was from Kolhapur. She is the youngest sister of Shivangi Kolhapure (wife of Shakti Kapoor) and Padmini Kolhapure and mausi (aunt) to Shraddha Kapoor.

She is the niece of singer Lata Mangeshkar, as her paternal grandmother was the half-sister of Deenanath Mangeshkar, Lata's father. Her mother was a Mangalorean Nirupama Prabhu her family hailed from Mangalore. She held a job working for the airlines.

Kolhapure and her husband, Pankaj Saraswat, had a daughter in 2015.

Career
Before she started her career with modelling and films, she made her debut with a television series, Mujhe Chaand Chahiye, directed by Raja Bundela on Zee TV. She appeared in the "Saughat" and "Tum Bin", episodes of the miniseries Rishtey on Zee TV. She was also involved in theatre.

She did a Modelling assignment in a Fashion Catalogue published by Krupa Kreations - Vimal N. Upadhyaya in the year of 1992. In same edition of this Catalogue, she was accompanied by Aishwarya Rai,  Sonali Bendre and Niki Aneja etc.

Her first film made with Anurag Kashyap, Paanch, was not initially released. Paanch was delayed in its release due to problems with the depictions of violence, language and drug use in the film. Her appearance in Ugly was with the director, Kashyap, once more where she played a depressed young woman who was also an alcoholic. Kolhapure said that filming Ugly was a draining experience. The Hindustan Times wrote that "Kolhapure plays a battered wife and brings out the pain of a barren life perfectly."

Theatre
1999
"The Magic Pill" directed by Satyadev Dubey
"Sabse Bada Thag" directed by Makrand Deshpandey

2000
"Brahma Vishnu Mahesh" directed by Satyadev Dubey.
 
2002
"Modh" during the 'Prithvi Festival 2002' directed by Ahlam Khan

2005
"Beauty, Brains, & Personality" directed by Vandana Sajnani

2007
"Flirt in Your Dreams" directed by Satyadev Dubey

2008
"All About Women" directed by Hidayat Sami

Films

References

External links
 
 

Indian film actresses
Living people
Marathi people
Actresses from Maharashtra
1980 births